Mary Reilly is a 1990 parallel novel by American writer Valerie Martin.  It is inspired by Robert Louis Stevenson's classic 1886 novella Strange Case of Dr. Jekyll and Mr. Hyde.  It was nominated for the Nebula Award for Best Novel in 1990 and the World Fantasy Award for Best Novel in 1991.  Martin's novel was the basis for the 1996 film of the same name starring Julia Roberts in the title role.

Plot introduction
The novel is about a young girl working at the home of Dr. Henry Jekyll who falls in love with her master. Jekyll's "assistant", Edward Hyde, is generally considered her nemesis. Mary Reilly adds more details and substance to the original book, Strange Case of Dr. Jekyll and Mr. Hyde, by telling the story from the unique perspective of the housemaid, Mary Reilly.

1990 British novels
Parallel literature
Novels by Valerie Martin
British novels adapted into films
Doubleday (publisher) books
Adaptations of works by Robert Louis Stevenson